Death Before Dinner is a 1948  detective novel by E.C.R. Lorac, the pen name of the British writer Edith Caroline Rivett. It is the thirtieth in her long-running series featuring Chief Inspector MacDonald of Scotland Yard, one of the detectives of the Golden Age of Detective Fiction who relies on standard police procedure to solve his cases. It was published in the United States by Doubleday under the alternative title of A Screen for Murder.

Synopsis
Eight famous explorers and travellers are invited to a London restaurant for the award of the Marco Polo award. The evening ends with the murder of their host, the adventurer Elias Trowne.

References

Bibliography
 Cooper, John & Pike, B.A. Artists in Crime: An Illustrated Survey of Crime Fiction First Edition Dustwrappers, 1920-1970. Scolar Press, 1995.
 Hubin, Allen J. Crime Fiction, 1749-1980: A Comprehensive Bibliography. Garland Publishing, 1984.
 Nichols, Victoria & Thompson, Susan. Silk Stalkings: More Women Write of Murder. Scarecrow Press, 1998.
 Reilly, John M. Twentieth Century Crime & Mystery Writers. Springer, 2015.

1948 British novels
British mystery novels
Novels by E.C.R. Lorac
Novels set in London
British detective novels
Collins Crime Club books